A paint roller is a paint application tool used for painting large flat surfaces rapidly and efficiently.

The paint roller typically consists of two parts: a "roller frame," and a "roller cover." The roller cover absorbs the paint and transfers it to the painted surface, the roller frame attaches to the roller cover. A painter holds the roller by the handle section. The roller frame is reusable. It is possible to clean and reuse a roller cover, but it is also typically disposed of after use.

The roller cover is a cylindrical core with a pile fabric covering secured to the cylindrical core. Foam rubber rollers are also produced. There are both foam and fabric rollers that are individually available (without a handle), made to replace worn out rollers, once an old roller is removed the new roller can be fitted onto the handle section for use. An innovation of the cylindrical core has allowed it to contain paint inside, with the cover absorbing paint from the inside and filtering it through (naturally by wicking) to be applied externally, when the roller is rolled.

History

Norman James Breakey 

In Canada, Norman James Breakey invented a paint roller in 1940, had it patented in Canada, and produced it in a home factory. After WW II, he sold at least 50,000 of the paint rollers under the name Koton Kotor and it was also sold as the TECO roller by Eaton's.

Richard Croxton Adams 
In the United States, Richard Croxton Adams produced a paint roller in a basement workshop in 1940 and patented it in the United States. The patent application was filed in 1942. However, a similar paint roller patent application was filed in the United States two years earlier in 1940 by inventor Fride E. Dahstrom.

American Roller Stippler Company 

In 1938 Morris Welt was a painting contractor in New York City. His son, David Welt went to a print shop to have business cards made so he could promote his father's work. David saw the printer rolling ink on to metal type. This gave him the idea that paint could be rolled. In the basement of their apartment, David Welt created the first paint roller using bent steel for the frame and he glued some carpet on to a wooden dowel to make the roller cover. The initial handmade rollers were not very good at applying paint but did a great job of "stippling" (covering brush strokes and surface imperfections). Morris and David named their company ARSCO which stood for American Roller Stippler Company. As they found better fabrics for the roller cores, the business grew and they began supplying Sherwin-Williams, Glidden Paints and many others around the world. In 1956 the small ARSCO Paint Roller factory moved from a small New York warehouse to a block long factory in Hialeah, Florida. April 1963 Colormatic Magazine honored the father and son team as Morris and David Welt celebrated their 25th anniversary by publishing a full page editorial detailing the history of this invention in 1938. In 1974, David Welt's son joined Arsco. Glenn Welt purchased the paint roller business from his father, renamed the company to Arsco International and continued manufacturing paint rollers and accessories until 2017.

References

Painting techniques
Painting materials
Products introduced in 1940